Iskra Delta was a computer manufacturer from Slovenia, and one of the biggest computer producers in SFR Yugoslavia that saw its own end with the breakup of the country.  It started in 1974 as Elektrotehna, the Ljubljana representative of Digital Equipment Corporation, a USA minicomputer manufacturer with an office in Belgrade.  It began assembling PDP-11 minicomputers in Ljubljana from DEC processors and Ampex disks in 1978.  Rapid expansion over all major Yugoslav Republics.  It had a joint venture with Energoinvest, Sarajevo.  Video terminals' assembly was in Paka, Slovenj Gradec. Forced merger with Iskra and Gorenje computer divisions resulted in Iskra-Delta's enlargement to 2,000 employees.  Delays with microcomputer technology and freer import brought its collapse in 1988.
As always, the real reasons (for collapse of Iskra Delta) are deeper and hidden from public eye.  It was disclosed recently that Iskra-Delta with Energoinvest installed a computer network of 17 USA VAX computers to Chinese secret police in 1985.  Export license was given under the premise  of preventing bicycles theft. DEC and CIA cancelled the representation agreement soon after that. The life and fall of one of the biggest IT companies of the time in Europe, is best described in the book written by Delta's former CEO, Janez Škrubej (https://www.amazon.com/The-Cold-War-Information-Technology/dp/1618978357). It is not exaggerated to say that the company was the victim of the Cold War as much as domestic corrupted politicians in service of foreign powers.  

Iskra Delta's bankruptcy proceedings began on February 5, 1990 and were completed in February 2021, after 31 years.

See also
 Iskra Delta 800
 Iskra Delta Partner
 Triglav
 Iskradata 1680
 History of computer hardware in the SFRY

External links

 "iskra-delta club"

Computer companies of Yugoslavia
Computer companies of Slovenia